Midway is a city in Madison County, Texas, United States at the junction of the La Bahía Road (now Texas State Highway 21) and the Old San Antonio Road in northeastern Madison County.

Midway was the birthplace of George McJunkin, who was born a slave.

Geography

Midway is located at  (31.023176, –95.751081).

Demographics
{{stack|

As of the 2020 United States census, there were 173 people, 114 households, and 87 families residing in the city.

As of the census of 2000,  288 people, 120 households, and 86 families resided in the city. The population density was 179.6 people per square mile (69.5/km). The 151 housing units averaged 94.2 per square mile (36.4/km). The racial makeup of the city was 80.90% White, 15.97% African American, 0.35% Native American, 1.39% from other races, and 1.39% from two or more races. Hispanics or Latinos of any race were 5.21% of the population.

Of the 120 households, 29.2% had children under the age of 18 living with them, 52.5% were married couples living together, 13.3% had a female householder with no husband present, and 28.3% were not families; 25.0% of all households were made up of individuals, and 14.2% had someone living alone who was 65 years of age or older. The average household size was 2.40 and the average family size was 2.83.

In the city, the population was distributed as 24.0% under the age of 18, 10.8% from 18 to 24, 23.6% from 25 to 44, 22.2% from 45 to 64, and 19.4% who were 65 years of age or older. The median age was 39 years. For every 100 females, there were 78.9 males. For every 100 females age 18 and over, there were 79.5 males.

The median income for a household in the city was $36,875, and for a family was $39,167. Males had a median income of $24,145 versus $24,375 for females. The per capita income for the city was $17,824. About 6.8% of families and 8.5% of the population were below the poverty line, including 3.7% of those under the age of 18 and 28.9% of those 65 or over.

Government
The Ferguson Unit, a Texas Department of Criminal Justice prison for men, is located in unincorporated Madison County, near Midway.

Climate
The climate in this area is characterized by hot, humid summers and generally mild to cool winters.  According to the Köppen climate classification system, Midway has a humid subtropical climate, Cfa on climate maps.

References

Cities in Texas
Cities in Madison County, Texas